Living the Dream is the second studio album by Swiss recording artist Luca Hänni. It was released by Universal Music on 19 April 2013 in German-speaking Europe.

Track listing

Charts

References

2013 albums
Luca Hänni albums